Professor Maximinus Friedrich Alexander de Crinis (29 May 1889 – 2 May 1945) held a chair in psychiatry in Cologne and at Charité in Berlin, and was a medical expert for the Action T4 Euthanasia Program who wrote the Euthanasia Decree, signed by Adolf Hitler on 20 September 1939.

Crinis was born in Ehrenhausen near Graz. As an Austrian, he joined the Nazi Party in 1931. Not only was de Crinis a high-ranking SS member, he was the most outspoken and influential Nazi in German psychiatry, a psychiatric consultant at the highest level of the regime. De Crinis became medical director of the Ministry of Education in 1941. He was also a director of the European League for Mental Hygiene. Furthermore, he politically supported fellow Nazi Max Clara's attempts to obtain professorship at the University of Leipzig.

According to Heinz Guderian, Dr De Crinis was the first doctor to correctly diagnose Hitler's malady as being Parkinson's disease. The diagnosis made in early 1945 was kept secret.

On 1 May 1945, after killing his family with potassium cyanide, de Crinis committed suicide in Stahnsdorf near Berlin, by taking a cyanide tablet himself.

References

Further reading
 Photograph at Axis History Forum
 Psychiatrists: The Men Behind Hitler by Roeder, Kubillus and Burwell 
 Geoffrey Cocks: Psychotherapy in the Third Reich: The Göring Institute (2nd ed), Oxford University Press, New York, 1985

1889 births
1945 deaths
German psychiatrists
Physicians of the Charité
SS-Standartenführer
History of psychiatry
Aktion T4 personnel
Nazis who committed suicide in Germany
Suicides by cyanide poisoning
Joint suicides by Nazis
20th-century Freikorps personnel
1945 suicides
Austrian Nazis
Poisoners